Damon Greaves (born 25 April 2000) is an Australian rules footballer who most recently played for the Hawthorn Football Club in the Australian Football League (AFL).

Early career 
A country kid at heart he played much of his junior football in Busselton before setting up to play for the East Perth Colts. Greaves played three games for Western Australia during the NAB AFL Under-18 Championships in 2018. A natural right footer, his father used to offer him 50 cents for every left foot kick he attempted thus made him capable with both feet.

AFL career 

Greaves' AFL career started by playing with the Hawthorn affiliate Box Hill Hawks, here under the tutelage of Hawthorn aligned coaches he spent his first year developing for the rigors of AFL football. A hard-working player with a penetrating kick he reads the game well. He is composed with the ball in hand and makes good decisions providing defensive rebound.

Greaves had to negotiate a difficult Covid-19 affected season. He showed promise during the pre-season games and with scratch matches against other AFL clubs. His patience was rewarded with a round 16 debut against .

Statistics
Statistics are correct to the end of 2021.

|- style=background:#EAEAEA
| 2019 ||  || 44
| 0 || — || — || — || — || — || — || — || — || — || — || — || — || — || — || 0
|-
| 2020 ||  || 44
| 3 || 0 || 0 || 35 || 17 || 52 || 17 || 5 || 0.0 || 0.0 || 11.7 || 5.7 || 17.3 || 5.7 || 1.7 || 0
|- style=background:#EAEAEA
| 2021 ||  || 30
| 7 || 1 || 0 || 48 || 26 || 74 || 16 || 12 || 0.1 || 0.0 || 6.9 || 3.7 || 10.6 || 2.3 || 1.7 || 0
|- class="sortbottom"
! colspan=3| Career
! 10 !! 1 !! 0 !! 83 !! 43 !! 126 !! 33 !! 17 !! 0.1 !! 0.0 !! 8.3 !! 4.3 !! 12.6 !! 3.3 !! 1.7 !! 0
|}

Notes

References

External links
 
 

Hawthorn Football Club players
2000 births
Living people
Australian rules footballers from Western Australia
Box Hill Football Club players
People from Busselton
Busselton Football Club players